The black-bearded tomb bat (Taphozous melanopogon) is a species of sac-winged bat found in South and South East Asia.

Taxonomy and etymology
It was described as a new species in 1841 by Dutch zoologist Coenraad Jacob Temminck. The holotype was collected on Java. Its species name "melanopogon" comes from Ancient Greek "mélās" meaning "black" and "pṓgōn" meaning "beard."

Description
It has a small "beard", or a tuft of black fur on its chin. Its fur is blackish-brown, with individual hairs white at the base.

Biology and ecology
The black-bearded tomb bat is highly colonial, forming large aggregations of up to 15,000 individuals while roosting. These roosts are located in temples, ruins, or caves. It is a seasonal breeder; young are born after a gestation length of 120–125 days. The typical litter size is one individual, though twins have been documented.

Range and habitat
This species ranges widely throughout Asia and Southeast Asia. Its range includes the following countries: Brunei, Cambodia, China, India, Indonesia, Laos, Malaysia, Myanmar, Philippines, Singapore, Sri Lanka, Thailand, Timor-Leste, and Vietnam.

See also

List of mammals in Hong Kong

References

Taphozous
Bats of Asia
Bats of South Asia
Bats of Southeast Asia
Bats of Indonesia
Bats of Malaysia
Mammals of China
Mammals of India
Mammals of Borneo
Mammals of Bangladesh
Mammals of Timor
Mammals of Singapore
Mammals of the Philippines
Mammals of Sri Lanka
Mammals of Thailand
Mammals of Myanmar
Mammals of Cambodia
Mammals of Vietnam
Mammals of Laos
Mammals of Brunei
Fauna of Sumatra
Least concern biota of Asia
Mammals described in 1841
Taxonomy articles created by Polbot
Taxa named by Coenraad Jacob Temminck
Bats of India